Novak Djokovic defeated Roger Federer in the final, 6–4, 6–4 to win the men's singles tennis title at the 2018 Cincinnati Masters. With the win, he became the first player to complete the career Golden Masters (winning all nine ATP Tour Masters 1000 events over a career) in singles.

Grigor Dimitrov was the defending champion, but lost to Djokovic in the third round.

Seeds
The top eight seeds receive a bye into the second round.

Draw

Finals

Top half

Section 1

Section 2

Bottom half

Section 3

Section 4

Qualifying

Seeds

Qualifiers

Lucky loser

Qualifying draw

First qualifier

Second qualifier

Third qualifier

Fourth qualifier

Fifth qualifier

Sixth qualifier

Seventh qualifier

References

External links
Main draw
Qualifying draw

Men's Singles